Her Excellency Marlene Inemwin Moses (born 1961 in Aiwo) is a diplomat and a political and administrative figure from Nauru. She has served since 2005 as the current Nauruan Permanent Representative to the United Nations, with ambassadorial rank, having previously held consular responsibilities in Japan and New Zealand.  She is also an expert in health administration.

Background and political affiliation 

Educated at Australian universities, Ms. Moses has for a number of years been associated with the Nauru First Party, along with figures such as Dr. Kieren Keke, who in December 2007 became Foreign Minister in President of Nauru Marcus Stephen's Administration, and David Adeang. However, she was not immediately identified with the internal dissentions which rocked Nauru First in 2007, leading to ministerial crises.

Professional record 

Moses is an experienced administrator with many years of public service to her credit, and, given that she has emerged from times of prolonged political crisis in Nauru with little taint of controversy to her record, some observers believe that she would be in a strong position to offer balanced and uncompromised leadership at some future time of ministerial crisis. Others would point to the fact that, although the sincerity of her past commitment to the Nauru First Party is not in question, she is relatively isolated from day to day constituency matters, and that her strengths are chiefly in diplomacy and administration rather than in Parliamentary affairs.

She is also a member of the band UNRocks, together with other diplomats.

Biographical note

The appointment of Marlene Moses to the UN, added to Millicent Aroi's appointment as High Commissioner at Suva, Fiji, signifies that women have occupied among the most senior of the Nauru's diplomatic posts.

Diplomatic issues

One issue which has exercised the Government of Nauru, and which has involved Moses, is the preservation of tuna fishing stocks in the country's territorial waters. For this reason, Moses, on the Nauru government's behalf, has argued for commercial whaling: this issue is likely to be heightened by the Australian government's recent volte face on the issue, given Nauru's dependence on Australia on many issues.

In January 2008 Moses participated in a Pacific Ambassadors' trip to Israel hosted by the Foreign Ministry of that country, with a view to enhancing the Region's relations with Israel.

See also 

 Foreign relations of Nauru
 Politics of Nauru

External links
 Marle Moses photo
 Marlene Moses and Nauru First political colleagues featured on November 1, 2001, Pacific Magazine, (incl. photo)
 Revolt looking in Nauru
 Speech in 2005 by Marlene Moses regarding whaling and tuna fishing
 links with Israel

1961 births
Living people
Women ambassadors
Nauruan women diplomats
Permanent Representatives of Nauru to the United Nations
Ambassadors of Nauru to the United States
Nauru First politicians
Nauruan women in politics
21st-century women politicians